Germany competed at the 2000 Summer Olympics in Sydney, Australia. 422 competitors, 241 men and 181 women, took part in 234 events in 29 sports.

Medalists
Germany finished in fifth position in the final medal rankings, with 13 gold medals and 56 medals overall.

Archery

The German women's archery team won its second Olympic medal in 2000 by defeating Turkey in the bronze medal match.
Men

Women

Athletics

Men's track

Men's field

Women's track

Women's field

Combined events
Men's decathlon

Women's heptathlon

Badminton

Men

Women

Mixed

Beach volleyball

Men

Women

Boxing

Canoeing

Slalom

Sprint
Men

Women

Cycling

Cross country

Road Cycling
Men

Women

Track cycling
Sprint

Pursuit

Time trial

Keirin

Omnium

Diving

Men

Women

Equestrian

Dressage

Eventing

Show jumping 

* Simons de Ridder was qualified to compete in the Grand Prix Freestyle but due to a restriction on the number of nation quotas (maximum number is 3), four Germans qualified for the Freestyle event but Simons de Ridder was placed fourth highest of the other German competitors (Capellmann, Salzgeber and Werth) which meant that she could not continue to the final round.

Fencing

18 fencers, 12 men and 6 women, represented Germany in 2000.

Men

Women

Football

Women's tournament
Roster

 Goalkeepers
 Nadine Angerer (FC Bayern München)
 Silke Rottenberg (FC Brauweiler Pulheim 2000)
 Defenders
 Doris Fitschen (1.FFC Frankfurt)
 Jeanette Götte (FFC Flaesheim Hillen)
 Stefanie Gottschlich (WSV Wolfsburg-Wendschott)
 Steffi Jones (1.FFC Frankfurt)
 Sandra Minnert (1.FFC Frankfurt)
 Kerstin Stegemann (FFC Flaesheim Hillen)
 Tina Wunderlich (1.FFC Frankfurt)

 Midfielders
 Ariane Hingst (1.FFC Turbine Potsdam)
 Melanie Hoffmann (FCR Duisburg)
 Renate Lingor (1.FFC Turbine Potsdam)
 Nicole Brandebusemeyer (FC Brauweiler Pulheim 2000)
 Bettina Wiegmann (FC Brauweiler Pulheim 2000)
Forwards
 Inka Grings (FCR Duisburg)
 Maren Meinert (FC Brauweiler Pulheim 2000)
 Claudia Müller (WSV Wolfsburg-Wendschott)
 Birgit Prinz (1.FFC Frankfurt)

Group stage

Semi-finals

Bronze medal match

Gymnastics

Men
Team

Individual events

Handball

Men's team
Team roster
 Markus Baur
 Frank von Behren
 Mike Bezdicek
 Henning Fritz
 Jan Holpert
 Florian Kehrmann
 Stefan Kretzschmar
 Jörg Kunze
 Sven Lakenmacher
 Klaus-Dieter Petersen
 Bernd Roos
 Christian Schwarzer
 Daniel Stephan
 Bogdan Wenta
 Volker Zerbe

Summary

Results

Quarterfinals

5-8th place semifinals

5/6th classification game

Hockey

Men
Team roster
 Clemens Arnold
 Christoph Bechmann
 Philipp Crone
 Oliver Domke
 Christoph Eimer
 Björn Emmerling
 Michael Green
 Florian Kunz
 Christian Mayerhöfer
 Björn Michel
 Ulrich Moissl
 Sascha Reinelt
 Christopher Reitz
 Christian Wein
 Tibor Weißenborn
 Matthias Witthaus
Head coach: Paul Lissek

Summary

Women
Team roster
 Friederike Barth
 Britta Becker
 Birgit Beyer
 Caroline Casaretto
 Tanja Dickenscheid
 Nadine Ernsting-Krienke
 Simone Grässer
 Franziska Gude
 Katrin Kauschke
 Natascha Keller
 Denise Klecker
 Heike Lätzsch
 Inga Möller
 Fanny Rinne
 Marion Rodewald
 Julia Zwehl
Head coach: Berti Rauth

Summary

Judo

Men

Women

Modern pentathlon

Rhythmic gymnastics

Group all-around

Individual all-around

Rowing

Men

Reserves
 Martin Weis
 Bernd Heidicker
 Jörg Lehnigk
 Philipp Stüer

Women

Reserves
 Angelika Brand
 Peggy Waleska

Sailing

Eleven men and four women competed in ten Sailing event competitions, winning one silver medal and one bronze medal.

Men

Women

Open
Fleet racing

Match racing

Shooting

Men

Women

Swimming

Men

Women 

Key: * – swimmers who only competed in the preliminary heats.

Table tennis

Men

Women

Taekwondo

Tennis

Men

Women

Trampolining

Triathlon

Volleyball

Team roster
 Christina Benecke
 Beatrice Dömeland
 Judith Flemig
 Angelina Grün
 Tanja Hart
 Susanne Lahme
 Hanka Pachale
 Anja-Nadin Pietrek
 Sylvia Roll
 Christina Schultz
 Judith Sylvester
 Kerstin Tzscherlich
Head coach: Lee Hee-Wan

Results

Weightlifting

Men

Women

Wrestling

Freestyle

Greco-Roman

Notes

 International Olympic Committee Web Site
 International Olympic Committee (2001) The Results Retrieved 12 November 2005.
 Official Report of the XXVII Olympiad Volume 1: Preparing for the Games Sydney Organising Committee for the Olympic Games (2001).  Retrieved 20 November 2005.
 Official Report of the XXVII Olympiad Volume 2: Celebrating the Games. Sydney Organising Committee for the Olympic Games (2001). Retrieved 20 November 2005.
 Olympia-Statistik
 The Results. Sydney Organising Committee for the Olympic Games (2001). Retrieved 20 November 2005.
 Wallechinsky, David (2004). The Complete Book of the Summer Olympics (Athens 2004 Edition). Toronto, Canada. .

References

Nations at the 2000 Summer Olympics
2000
Summer Olympics